Marcus Burley (born July 16, 1990) is a former American football cornerback. He was signed by the Jacksonville Jaguars as an undrafted free agent after the 2013 NFL Draft. He played college football at Delaware.

Early life
Burley attended Highland Springs High School in Highland Springs, Virginia.

Professional career

Jacksonville Jaguars
After going undrafted, Burley was signed to the Jacksonville Jaguars' active roster on September 14, 2013, after spending the first week of the season on the practice squad. He was released on September 16, 2013, and re-signed to the practice squad the next day.
He was released from the practice squad on October 1, 2013.

Philadelphia Eagles
He was signed to the Philadelphia Eagles practice squad on October 9, 2013. He was later released.

Indianapolis Colts
He was signed by the Rams for the final two weeks of the regular season and then by the Colts shortly thereafter.

Seattle Seahawks
Burley was traded to the Seahawks on August 30, 2014 for a 6th round pick in the 2015 NFL Draft. With the trade Burley became a member of the Legion of Boom defensive.

In 2014 vs the Carolina Panthers, Burley recorded his first interception against Cam Newton. He finished the season with 35 tackles, one sack, five passes defensed and one interception.

In 2015 vs the Browns, Burley recorded both a sack and an interception on Johnny Manziel. He finished his second season with the Seahawks with 18 tackles, one sack, two passes defensed and one interception.

On September 3, 2016, he was released by the Seahawks.

Cleveland Browns
On September 4, 2016, Burley was claimed off waivers by the Browns.

On September 3, 2017, Burley was released by the Browns.

Houston Texans
On September 6, 2017, Burley was signed by the Houston Texans. He was waived on October 25, 2017.

References

External links
Jacksonville Jaguars bio

1990 births
Living people
Players of American football from Richmond, Virginia
American football cornerbacks
Delaware Fightin' Blue Hens football players
Jacksonville Jaguars players
Philadelphia Eagles players
St. Louis Rams players
Indianapolis Colts players
Seattle Seahawks players
Cleveland Browns players
Houston Texans players